Rabid Grannies is a 1988 American horror comedy film written and directed by Emmanuel Kervyn. It stars Danielle Daven and Anne-Marie Fox as elderly sisters who, after receiving a present from an ostracized black sheep relative, kill their greedy family. It was distributed in the US on VHS and DVD by Troma Entertainment, who made severe cuts to the film. In 1990, the film was nominated for an International Fantasy Film Award, Best Film for Emmanuel Kervyn.

Plot
Set in West Flanders, Belgium in the 1980s, two elderly sisters invite their wonderful nieces and nephews to a dinner party in celebration of the sisters' upcoming birthdays. The one nephew who is not invited is the ostracised black sheep of the family whose devil-worshipping activities have resulted in his being removed from the sisters' inheritance. The rest of the guests are merely putting in time; they are actually only waiting for their aunts to die, leaving them amply endowed via their respective inheritances. Unfortunately for all but the aunts, the nephew sends a party gift that turns the scene into a frolic of the macabre and ruins the party: under the gift's power, the aunts turn into cannibalistic demons and proceed to eat up all of their guests.

Cast

Production 
After the production of Lucker the Necrophagus, Johan Vandewoestijne met with director Emmauel Kervyn at the Brussels offices of VDS Films. Emmanuel was a martial art expert and had a project called "Talion" that he wanted to shoot with Jean-Claude Van Damme. André Coppens, manager of VDS Films engaged himself to produce the film . After doing long weeks of preparation there came a time when they had to order, for instance raw stock, rent camera equipment, rent lighting and grip material but producer Coppens had no money left on his account. Fortunately Kervyn had the script of a horror movie called 'The Long Night' ready to be used. The movie was shot from October 14, 1988, to January 8, 1989, on location in Kortrijk and in the castle of Ingelmunster. To sell the movie internationally, the director made all the French-speaking cast read their English lines phonetically.

Release
The film was released and distributed in the US on VHS and DVD by Troma Entertainment. The Troma release removes a lot of the gore from the feature film. These scenes are available as bonus features on the DVD. Its Blu-ray debut was 10 March 2015, presenting the film in a "producer's cut" with the gore scenes reinstated. Special features are the same as the original Troma DVD.

Reception 
Due to its unusual subject and title and its graphic scenes of gore, Rabid Grannies is one of the most infamous titles in the Troma library.  Kervyn, the director, felt Troma's cuts made the film incomprehensible, but cult film fans found the film's bizarre incomprehensibility entertaining.

In 1990, Rabid Grannies was nominated for one International Fantasy Film Award, Best Film for Emmanuel Kervyn.

References

External links

1988 films
1988 horror films
American horror films
American independent films
English-language French films
Troma Entertainment films
Parodies of horror
1980s American films